The 2018 Global Awards ceremony was held on Thursday, 1 March 2018 at London's Eventim Apollo.
It started at 7:30 pm and was shown live on Capital TV and Heart TV. It was also available to watch on the Capital FM Website, on all the socials and on the radio. The Capital FM Global Awards radio schedule was as follows: Backstage on Capital Drive Time from 4pm GMT until 7pm GMT and then JJ, live from backstage from 7pm GMT chatting to the guests.

Performances and special appearances from Sam Smith, Rita Ora, Kasabian, Martin Garrix, Andrea Bocelli and Liam Payne.

Roman Kemp, Rochelle Humes and Myleene Klass hosted the ceremony.

Performances

Nominees and winners 
The list of nominees was announced in December 2017. Winners are listed first, in bold.

References

External links

Global Radio
British music awards
Global Awards
Global Awards
2018 awards in the United Kingdom